Judge Morris may refer to:

Brian Morris (judge) (born 1963), judge of the United States District Court for the District of Montana
Buckner Stith Morris (1800–1879), judge of the Lake County Circuit Court in Illinois
Charles Morris (1731–1802), Canadian probate court judge
Charles E. Morris (1814–1902), Wisconsin state court judge
George Franklin Morris (1866–1953), judge of the United States District Court for the District of New Hampshire
Hugh M. Morris (1878–1966), judge of the United States District Court for the District of Delaware
James Ward Morris (1890–1960), judge of the United States District Court for the District of Columbia
Joseph Wilson Morris (1922–2021), judge of the United States District Court for the Eastern District of Oklahoma
Logan Morris (1889–1977), judge of the United States Board of Tax Appeals
Naomi E. Morris (1921–1986), judge of the North Carolina Court of Appeals
Page Morris (1853–1924), judge of the United States District Court for the District of Minnesota
Robert Morris (judge) (1745–1815), judge of the United States District Courts for the District of New Jersey, and the Eastern and Western Districts of New Jersey
Thomas John Morris (1837–1912), judge of the United States District Court for the District of Maryland

See also
Justice Morris (disambiguation)